Joseph Miller Wood was an American football coach.  He served as the head football coach at the University of Virginia for one season, in 1914, compiling a record of 8–1. He was a member of Beta Theta Pi.

Head coaching record

References

Year of birth missing
Year of death missing
Virginia Cavaliers football coaches